Novoalexandrovka is a rural locality (a selo) and the administrative center of Novoalexandrovsky Selsoviet, Rubtsovsky District, Altai Krai, Russia. The population was 877 as of 2013. There are 6 streets.

Geography 
Novoalexandrovka is located 20 km south of Rubtsovsk (the district's administrative centre) by road. Kolos is the nearest rural locality.

References 

Rural localities in Rubtsovsky District